The commandant of the Coast Guard is the service chief and highest-ranking member of the United States Coast Guard. The commandant is an admiral, appointed for a four-year term by the president of the United States upon confirmation by the United States Senate.  The commandant is assisted by a vice commandant, who is also an admiral, and two area commanders (U.S. Coast Guard Pacific Area and U.S. Coast Guard Atlantic Area) and two deputy commandants (deputy commandant for operations and deputy commandant for mission support), all of whom are vice admirals.

Though the United States Coast Guard is one of the six military branches of the United States, unlike the other service chiefs, the commandant of the Coast Guard is not a member of the Joint Chiefs of Staff. The commandant is, however, entitled to the same supplemental pay as each member of the Joint Chiefs, per  ($4,000 per annum in 2009), and is accorded privilege of the floor under Senate Rule XXIII(1) as a de facto JCS member during presidential addresses.

The commandant maintains operational command over the Coast Guard, unlike the chiefs of the other services, who serve only administrative roles.  Thus, while the operational chain of command for the other services (per the Goldwater–Nichols Act) goes from the president through the secretary of defense to the combatant commanders of the unified combatant commands, command and control of the Coast Guard goes from the president through the secretary of homeland security (or secretary of defense, when the Coast Guard is acting as a service in the Department of the Navy) through the commandant.  Prior to the creation of the Department of Homeland Security in 2003, the United States Coast Guard operated under and the commandant reported to the secretary of transportation from 1966 to 2003, and the secretary of the treasury from 1790 until 1966.

The current and 27th commandant is Admiral Linda L. Fagan, who assumed office on 1 June 2022. She is the first woman to serve in the role.

History
The title of commandant dates to a 1923 act that distributed the commissioned line and engineer officers of the U.S. Coast Guard in grades. Before 1923, the rank and title of the head of the Coast Guard was "captain-commandant." The rank "captain-commandant" originated in the Revenue Cutter Service in 1908. The original holder of that rank was the Chief of the Revenue Cutter Service (also known as the Revenue Marine). The Coast Guard traces the lineage of commandants back to Captain Leonard G. Shepard, chief of the Revenue Marine Bureau, even though he never officially received the title of captain-commandant. The captain-commandant position was created in 1908 when Captain Worth G. Ross was the first to actually hold the position. Although he was retired, Ross's predecessor, Captain Charles F. Shoemaker, was elevated to the rank of captain-commandant. Shoemaker's predecessor, Captain Shepard, had already died and was not elevated to the rank.

Chiefs of the Revenue Marine Bureau

Chiefs exercised centralized control over the Revenue Marine Bureau.

Captain Alexander V. Fraser, USRM, 1843–1848
Captain Richard Evans, USRM, 1848–1849

In 1849 the Revenue Marine Bureau was dissolved, and the Revenue Marine fell under the control the commissioner of customs until the Revenue Marine Bureau was again established in 1869.

N. Broughton Devereux, 1869–1871
Sumner I. Kimball, 1871–1878
Ezra Clark, 1878–1885
Peter Bonnett, 1885–1889

List of commandants
There have been 27 commandants of the Coast Guard since the office of chief of the Revenue Marine Bureau was transferred to a military billet. This includes Admiral Linda L. Fagan, the current commandant.

Timeline

See also
Vice Commandant of the Coast Guard
Master Chief Petty Officer of the Coast Guard

Notes

Footnotes

Citations

References cited

External links
Commandant's official website

 
United States Coast Guard job titles